Mariusz Kuras (born 21 August 1965 in Poland) is a Polish retired footballer and currently football manager.

References

Polish footballers
Living people
Association football midfielders
1965 births
Pogoń Szczecin players
Sportspeople from Częstochowa
Maccabi Jaffa F.C. players
Polish football managers
GKS Bełchatów managers
Radomiak Radom managers
Pogoń Szczecin managers
Odra Wodzisław Śląski managers
Zawisza Bydgoszcz managers
Sandecja Nowy Sącz managers